Ninnidh (alias Ninnidh the Pious, meaning one eyed Ninnidh, Nennius, Nennidhius, Ninnaid) was a 6th-century Irish Christian saint. St. Ninnidh is regarded as one of the Twelve Apostles of Ireland. His feast day is 18 January.

Ninnidh of Inismacsaint is often confused with Saint Ninnidh of the Pure Hand who attended Brigid of Kildare on her deathbed.

Life
Ninnidh was born in County Donegal, a grandson of Laoghaire, the High King of Ireland. He was educated under St. Finian at Clonard, where his fellow students included Ciarán of Clonmacnoise, St. Molaise of Devenish and St. Aidan of Ferns. St. Ninnidh preached along the South shore of Lough Erne making the island of Inishmacsaint (Island of the  Sorrel Plain) his headquarters around 532. Ciarán visited Inishmacsaint in 534.

Ninnidh likely journeyed up and down the Southern portion of Lower Lough Erne in a hollowed-out boat, coming ashore and making his way inland to meet people and spread the gospel. After St. Patrick's time, the Celtic Church was divided into many territories and ruled by Abbots of Monasteries, only some of whom were Bishops. St. Ninnidh built a monastery on Inishmacsaint Isle (near Devenish) circa 530A.D. and using the waterways of the time cared for the people from the Erne as far as the sea, sending his priests and monks to the local Churches. In 530 AD Ninnidh held a 40-day fast on Knockninny Hill, during the period of Lent.

Other accounts

The monks of Ramsgate in their Book of Saints say only,

The hagiographer Alban Butler wrote in the Lives of the Irish Saints (1823),

Legacy

St. Ninnidh's feast day is 18 January. St. Ninnidh's well is situated at Knockninny Quay on the shores of Upper Lough Erne and is reputed to have curative properties for eye ailments. In William Henry's Upper Lough Erne in 1739 the well was described as a chief curiosity, "being a plentiful foundation of pure water, having a clearance and coolness scarce to be met with. It was at that time a popular spot for boatspeople to retire to for their entertainments for which and around it are arranged benches of sod and over it a shade of aquatic trees".

St. Ninnidh's bell, traditionally presented to Ninnidh by St. Senach of Derrybrusk, was kept in Knockninny parish in the 17th century. It was at Castle Caldwell (now incorporated into the Enniskillen Castle Museum in County Fermanagh until 1877, when it was sold at auction to Robert Day of Cork (who sketched the drawing  to right). When Day's collection was sold in 1913, this bell was not part of the sale. Although for some time it was identified with a bell in the National Museum of Edinburgh (probably St. Ninian's Bell, formerly from the collection of John Bell), the location of St. Ninnidh's Bell is unknown.

See also
Knockninny

References

External links

 
 
St Ninnidh Stained Glass Window

Medieval Irish saints
6th-century Irish priests
People from County Donegal
People from County Fermanagh